James L. Noonan (1823 – December 19, 1898) was a merchant and political figure in Newfoundland. He represented Bonavista Bay in the Newfoundland and Labrador House of Assembly from 1869 to 1873 and from 1883 to 1886 as an Anti-Confederate and then Conservative.

He established himself in business at Greenspond. Noonan was colonial secretary from 1871 to 1873 and receiver general from 1885 to 1886. He was defeated when he ran for reelection in 1873. In 1882, he was defeated by Walter B. Grieve; Grieve's election was overturned and Noonan was declared elected in 1883. Noonan was forced to run for reelection after he was named to the Executive Council in 1885; he was defeated by Alfred B. Morine in 1886. Later that year, he was named assistant collector of customs at St. John's. He died there in 1898.

References 
 

Members of the Newfoundland and Labrador House of Assembly
1823 births
1898 deaths
Colonial Secretaries of Newfoundland
Members of the Executive Council of Newfoundland and Labrador